Félix Verdeja Bardales (10 April 1904 – 20 May 1977) was a Lieutenant colonel in the Spanish Army. Verdeja Bardales was the designer principally responsible for the Verdeja light tank, between 1938 and 1954.

Verdeja Bardales was born in the Asturian village of Panes in Peñamellera Baja.

1904 births
1977 deaths
People from Oriente (Asturian comarca)
Spanish army officers
Spanish military personnel of the Spanish Civil War (National faction)
Spanish industrial designers